ACI Technologies Inc. (ACI), formerly known as the American Competitiveness Institute, is an American scientific research corporation founded by Alan J. Criswell in 1992. Located in Philadelphia, Pennsylvania, ACI operates a  facility dedicated to the advancement of the electronics industry and research and development of various electronic manufacturing methods and materials. Early in its existence, ACI acquired a defense contract from the Office of Naval Research known as the Electronics Manufacturing Productivity Facility (EMPF).

External links

The Electronics Manufacturing Productivity Facility (EMPF)

References
DefenseLink: Contracts for Tuesday, October 31, 2000
NASA – "The American Competitiveness Institute was assigned the task to perform Salt Atmosphere and. Humidity Exposure Tests."
NASA - Lead-Free Solder Project: Final Report - Mechanical Shock Environmental Testing of Tin-Lead and Lead-Free Circuit Boards - "The American Competitiveness Institute (ACI) performed a series of Environmental Stress Tests for the Joint Council of Aging Aircraft / Joint Group of Pollution Prevention (JCAA / JG-PP) Lead Free Soldering Program."

Research institutes in Pennsylvania
Training organizations
Research institutes established in 1992
1992 establishments in Pennsylvania